Bhalubang (Nepali:भालुबाङ), sometimes Bhaluwang (Nepali:भालुवाङ) is a place located in Rapti Rural Municipality, Dang Deukhuri District, Nepal and the capital of Lumbini Province. Bhalubang literally refers bear ground. Before human settlement, that place was a play ground and habitat of bears. Historically Kham Magar dominated Area. In Kham Magar language bang Mean:Ground. Human settlement on Bhalubang started mainly in two different stages: before the construction of west rapti bridge and, after the construction of west rapti bridge. Bhalubang, the land of ethnic diversity, is lying on lap of Chure hills along with the West Rapti River. It is the local market place; people from nearby villages come for shopping.

Before the construction of bridge on rapti, human settlement was there on east part of Pulchowk; known as upper Bhalubang. Human settlement on next phase was started after construction of Rapti Setu bridge and that human habitation is now known as pulchowk or lower Bhalubang. People of Nepal, while returning from India, used to travel through Banghushree before the construction of this bridge.

Jwalamai gan is an armed police camp and a regional police training center. This camp is located on the west side of Bhalubang where Maoist attack in 2002 AD (2058 BS) caused huge loss of life and property.

References

Populated places in Dang District, Nepal